Mayfair is a census-designated place in Fresno County, California, United States. The 2010 U.S. census reported Mayfair's population was 4,589.

Demographics
At the 2010 census Mayfair had a population of 4,589. The racial makeup of Mayfair was 2,030 (44.2%) White, 169 (3.7%) African American, 99 (2.2%) Native American, 310 (6.8%) Asian, 14 (0.3%) Pacific Islander, 1,738 (37.9%) from other races, and 229 (5.0%) from two or more races. Hispanic or Latino of any race were 3,010 persons (65.6%).

The census reported that 4,581 people (99.8% of the population) lived in households, 8 (0.2%) lived in non-institutionalized group quarters, and no one was institutionalized.

There were 1,397 households, 680 (48.7%) had children under the age of 18 living in them, 602 (43.1%) were opposite-sex married couples living together, 315 (22.5%) had a female householder with no husband present, 137 (9.8%) had a male householder with no wife present.  There were 137 (9.8%) unmarried opposite-sex partnerships, and 16 (1.1%) same-sex married couples or partnerships. 262 households (18.8%) were one person and 107 (7.7%) had someone living alone who was 65 or older. The average household size was 3.28.  There were 1,054 families (75.4% of households); the average family size was 3.73.

The age distribution was 1,464 people (31.9%) under the age of 18, 519 people (11.3%) aged 18 to 24, 1,239 people (27.0%) aged 25 to 44, 952 people (20.7%) aged 45 to 64, and 415 people (9.0%) who were 65 or older.  The median age was 29.7 years. For every 100 females, there were 99.8 males.  For every 100 females age 18 and over, there were 94.2 males.

The homeowner vacancy rate was 1.8%; the rental vacancy rate was 5.3%.  2,473 people (53.9% of the population) lived in owner-occupied housing units and 2,108 people (45.9%) lived in rental housing units.

References

Census-designated places in Fresno County, California
Census-designated places in California